Hereford is the county town of Herefordshire. It may also refer to:

Geography

United Kingdom
 Hereford (UK Parliament constituency) (1295–2010)
 Hereford and South Herefordshire (UK Parliament constituency) (current)
 Little Hereford

United States
 Hereford, Arizona
 Hereford, Colorado
 Hereford, Maryland
 Hereford Zone, Maryland
 Hereford High School (Parkton, Maryland)
 Hereford, Minnesota
 Hereford, Missouri
 Hereford, Oregon
 Hereford, Pennsylvania
 Hereford, South Dakota
 Hereford, Texas
 Hereford, West Virginia

People
 Viscount Hereford, the senior Viscount in the Peerage of England
 Frank Hereford (politician) (1825–1891), American politician
 Frank Hereford (University of Virginia) (1923–2004), American academic
 Ernest H. Hereford (1894-1958), American academic administrator

Other uses
 Hereford (ship), a 1510-ton iron sailing ship
 Hereford cattle, a breed of cattle widely used in temperate areas
 Hereford F.C., current English football club
 Hereford pig, a breed of pig named for resembling the cattle
 Hereford United F.C., former English football club
 Handley Page Hereford, a variant of the Handley Page Hampden bomber
 Siege of Hereford, a 1645 siege during the English Civil War

See also 
 Herefords, a town in northern Eswatini
 Herford (disambiguation)
 Hertford (disambiguation)